Dau Kola (also Romanized as Dā’ū Kolā; also known as Dāvūd Kolā) is a village in Dabuy-ye Jonubi Rural District, Dabudasht District, Amol County, Mazandaran Province, Iran. At the 2006 census, its population was 278, in 74 families.

References 

Populated places in Amol County